Huaqiao is a metro station on Line 11 of the Shanghai Metro. Located at the intersection of Guangming Road and Yanhu Avenue in Huaqiao, Kunshan, Jiangsu, it serves as the current western terminus on the branch line of Line 11.

History

Shanghai Metro
The station for Shanghai Metro Line 11 opened on 16 October 2013. It is an elevated station.

From 26 January 2020 to 24 March 2020, services on a segment of Shanghai Metro Line 11 between Huaqiao and Anting stations were suspended due to the COVID-19 pandemic.

Suzhou Metro
The station for Suzhou Metro Line 11 will open in Late June 2023. It is an underground station.

Future Development 
The station will also serve as the eastern terminus of the future Line 11 of Suzhou Rail Transit, which is currently under construction. The station for Suzhou Line 11 will be underground.

References 

Railway stations in Jiangsu
Line 11, Shanghai Metro
Railway stations in China opened in 2013
Shanghai Metro stations in Kunshan